The Wonderful World of The Osmond Brothers is the debut album released by the Osmonds in 1968. Four singles were released from the album: "I've Got Lovin' on My Mind", "Clouds" (a cover version of "Both Sides, Now"), "Groove with What You've Got", and "Make the Music Flow".

Track listing

Charts

References

The Osmonds albums
1968 albums
albums produced by Gary Klein (producer)